Peter Allan Hansen (20 April 1944 – 18 April 2012) was a Danish classical philologist known principally for his work on the Carmina epigraphica graeca I-II and on other aspects of Greek epigraphy. Born in Copenhagen he was educated at Copenhagen University and at Brasenose College, Oxford, where he was a pupil of Lilian H. Jeffery. After 1975 he settled in Oxford and through the support of scholarships and grants continued his work on Hesychios and epigraphy there.

Selected works

'The Manuscript Tradition of Plutarch's De Malignitate Herodoti', Cahiers de l'Institutdu Moyen-Âge grec a Latin 2 (Copenhague 1969) 1-25.
'Ille Ego Qui Quondam ... Once Again ', The Classical Quarterly 22 (1972) 139–149.'
Pletho and Herodotean Malice', Cahiers de l'Institut du Moyen-Âge grec a Latin 12(Copenhague 1974) 1-10.
'An Olympic Victor by the Name of "kles". An Archaic funerary inscription ', Kadmos13 (1974 fasc.2 publ. 1975), 156–163.'
Friedländer, Epigrammata 177 d', Zeitschrift für Papyrologie und Epigraphik 16 (1975)79-80.Aigis 12.22
A List of Greek Verse Inscriptions down to 400 BC An Analytical Survey. Opuscula Graecolatina (Supplementa Musei Tusculani) 3 Copenhagen 1975 (Reprinted 1978). 53pp.
'An Epigraphical Ghost-Name', Zeitschrift für Papyrologie und Epigraphik 21 (1976)37-38.'
Pithecusan Humour. The Interpretation of "Nestor's Cup" Reconsidered ', Glotta 54(1976) 25–44.
A Bibliography of English Contributions to Classical Scholarship from the SixteenthCentury to 1970. (Danish Humanist Texts and Studies, Edited by the Royal Library,Copenhagen, Vol 1) Copenhagen: Rosenkilde & Bagger, 1977. xviii, 335 pp.
'The Robe Episode of the Choephori', The Classical Quarterly 28 (1978) 239–240.'
DAA 374-375 and the Early Elegiac epigram', Glotta 56 (1978 fasc. 3/4 publ. 1979)195-202.
Ploutarchou Peri tes Hērodotou kakoētheias, Plutarchi The Herodoti malignitate.Amsterdam: Hakkert, 1979. xviii, 77 pp.
Carmina Epigraphica graeca saeculorum VIII-V a.Chr.n. (Texte und Kommentare 12)Berlin and New York: de Gruyter, 1983. xxiii, 302 pp.
'The Potter Nicomachus and his Dedication (IG 14,652 = CEG 396)', Zeitschrift für Papyrologie und Epigraphik 58 (1985) 231–233.'
'The Date of "Nestor's Cup"', Zeitschrift für Papyrologie und Epigraphik 58 (1985) 234 Aigis 12.23
A List of Greek Verse Inscriptions c 400-300 BC with Addenda et Corrigenda to CEG (LGVI 2). Opuscula Graecolatina (Supplementa Musei Tusculani) 28 Copenhagen 1985. 52 pp.
'The Corpus of Greek Inscriptional Epigrams', Actes du IX'e Congrès Internationald'Épigraphie grecque et Latin 1 (1987) 167–171.
Carmina Epigraphica graeca saeculi IV a.Chr.n. (CEG 2). Accedunt addenda et Corrigenda ad CEG 1 (Texte und Kommentare 15) Berlin & New York: de Gruyter, 1989.xvii, 358 pp.
'Diogenes the Cynic at Venice', Zeitschrift für Papyrologie und Epigraphik 82 (1990)198-200.
Hesychii Alexandrini Lexicon. Volumen III: Π - Σ. (Sammlung griechischer und lateinis-cher grammatiker 11/3). Berlin and New York: de Gruyter, 2005. xxxiv, 404 pp.
(With Ian C. Cunningham) Hesychii Alexandrini Lexicon. Volumen IV: T-Ω. (Sammlung griechischer und lateinischer Grammatiker 11/4). Berlin & New York: de Gruyter,2009. xxxii, 281 pp.

Sources
 Obituary published in Aigis

Danish classical scholars
1944 births
2012 deaths
University of Copenhagen alumni
Alumni of Brasenose College, Oxford
Hellenic epigraphers